The Estonian Party for the Future (TULE) is an agrarian political party in Estonia.

It was founded in 2020 from the merger of the Estonian Free Party and the Estonian Biodiversity Party. At the February 2021 general assembly, Lauri Tõnspoeg was elected president of the party, and Vahur Kollom was elected vice-president. Urmas Heinaste, Mati Kose, Viktoria Lukats, Urmas Ott and Teet Randma were elected to the party board.

References 

Political parties in Estonia
Green parties in Europe
Green conservative parties
Political parties established in 2020
2020 establishments in Estonia
Agrarian parties